The Volgograd constituency (No.81) is a Russian legislative constituency in Volgograd Oblast. The constituency until 2007 covered central Volgograd, however, during 2015 redistricting the constituency was heavily gerrymandered, as it was expanded northward to predominantly rural districts of Mikhaylovka and Volzhsky constituencies.

Members elected

Election results

1993

|-
! colspan=2 style="background-color:#E9E9E9;text-align:left;vertical-align:top;" |Candidate
! style="background-color:#E9E9E9;text-align:left;vertical-align:top;" |Party
! style="background-color:#E9E9E9;text-align:right;" |Votes
! style="background-color:#E9E9E9;text-align:right;" |%
|-
|style="background-color:"|
|align=left|Igor Lukashyov
|align=left|Yavlinsky–Boldyrev–Lukin
|
|21.69%
|-
| colspan="5" style="background-color:#E9E9E9;"|
|- style="font-weight:bold"
| colspan="3" style="text-align:left;" | Total
| 
| 100%
|-
| colspan="5" style="background-color:#E9E9E9;"|
|- style="font-weight:bold"
| colspan="4" |Source:
|
|}

1995

|-
! colspan=2 style="background-color:#E9E9E9;text-align:left;vertical-align:top;" |Candidate
! style="background-color:#E9E9E9;text-align:left;vertical-align:top;" |Party
! style="background-color:#E9E9E9;text-align:right;" |Votes
! style="background-color:#E9E9E9;text-align:right;" |%
|-
|style="background-color:"|
|align=left|Alevtina Aparina
|align=left|Communist Party
|
|28.71%
|-
|style="background-color:"|
|align=left|Igor Lukashyov (incumbent)
|align=left|Yabloko
|
|15.31%
|-
|style="background-color:"|
|align=left|Aleksandr Polishchuk
|align=left|Our Home – Russia
|
|14.16%
|-
|style="background-color:"|
|align=left|Oleg Karpenko
|align=left|Liberal Democratic Party
|
|4.74%
|-
|style="background-color:"|
|align=left|Stanislav Terentyev
|align=left|Union of Patriots
|
|4.58%
|-
|style="background-color:#3A46CE"|
|align=left|Anatoly Yushchenko
|align=left|Democratic Choice of Russia – United Democrats
|
|2.91%
|-
|style="background-color:"|
|align=left|Aleksandr Gromov
|align=left|Independent
|
|2.81%
|-
|style="background-color:"|
|align=left|Aleksandr Arzamastsev
|align=left|Independent
|
|2.71%
|-
|style="background-color:"|
|align=left|Yury Titov
|align=left|Independent
|
|2.64%
|-
|style="background-color:"|
|align=left|Zinaida Kutyavina
|align=left|Independent
|
|1.46%
|-
|style="background-color:"|
|align=left|Vladimir Ignatyev
|align=left|Independent
|
|1.36%
|-
|style="background-color:#2998D5"|
|align=left|Valentin Vetoshkin
|align=left|Russian All-People's Movement
|
|1.28%
|-
|style="background-color:#1C1A0D"|
|align=left|Nikolay Mikhaylin
|align=left|Forward, Russia!
|
|1.09%
|-
|style="background-color:"|
|align=left|Fyodor Nikulin
|align=left|Independent
|
|0.90%
|-
|style="background-color:"|
|align=left|Konstantin Chuvilsky
|align=left|Independent
|
|0.57%
|-
|style="background-color:"|
|align=left|Aleksandr Bondarenko
|align=left|Independent
|
|0.54%
|-
|style="background-color:"|
|align=left|Vitaly Subota
|align=left|Independent
|
|0.53%
|-
|style="background-color:"|
|align=left|Vladimir Moskalev
|align=left|Independent
|
|0.52%
|-
|style="background-color:#192082"|
|align=left|Andrey Kuprikov
|align=left|Frontier Generation
|
|0.48%
|-
|style="background-color:"|
|align=left|Anatoly Yerokhin
|align=left|Independent
|
|0.36%
|-
|style="background-color:"|
|align=left|Sergey Kopylov
|align=left|Independent
|
|0.35%
|-
|style="background-color:"|
|align=left|Lyudmila Murtazaliyeva
|align=left|Independent
|
|0.24%
|-
|style="background-color:"|
|align=left|Sergey Stolbin
|align=left|Independent
|
|0.16%
|-
|style="background-color:#000000"|
|colspan=2 |against all
|
|9.06%
|-
| colspan="5" style="background-color:#E9E9E9;"|
|- style="font-weight:bold"
| colspan="3" style="text-align:left;" | Total
| 
| 100%
|-
| colspan="5" style="background-color:#E9E9E9;"|
|- style="font-weight:bold"
| colspan="4" |Source:
|
|}

1999

|-
! colspan=2 style="background-color:#E9E9E9;text-align:left;vertical-align:top;" |Candidate
! style="background-color:#E9E9E9;text-align:left;vertical-align:top;" |Party
! style="background-color:#E9E9E9;text-align:right;" |Votes
! style="background-color:#E9E9E9;text-align:right;" |%
|-
|style="background-color:"|
|align=left|Yevgeny Ishchenko
|align=left|Independent
|
|29.66%
|-
|style="background-color:"|
|align=left|Alevtina Aparina (incumbent)
|align=left|Communist Party
|
|22.92%
|-
|style="background-color:"|
|align=left|Vladimir Goryunov
|align=left|Our Home – Russia
|
|15.25%
|-
|style="background-color:"|
|align=left|Viktor Savenko
|align=left|Independent
|
|12.92%
|-
|style="background-color:"|
|align=left|Stanislav Terentyev
|align=left|Independent
|
|2.38%
|-
|style="background-color:"|
|align=left|Igor Lukashyov
|align=left|Independent
|
|2.12%
|-
|style="background-color:"|
|align=left|Galina Lobacheva
|align=left|Independent
|
|1.51%
|-
|style="background-color:#E2CA66"|
|align=left|Yevgeny Oleynikov
|align=left|For Civil Dignity
|
|1.26%
|-
|style="background-color:#FF4400"|
|align=left|Boris Pylin
|align=left|Andrey Nikolayev and Svyatoslav Fyodorov Bloc
|
|1.10%
|-
|style="background-color:"|
|align=left|Yelena Yefimova
|align=left|Liberal Democratic Party
|
|0.80%
|-
|style="background-color:"|
|align=left|Sergey Litvinenko
|align=left|Independent
|
|0.39%
|-
|style="background-color:#020266"|
|align=left|Oleg Karpenko
|align=left|Russian Socialist Party
|
|0.29%
|-
|style="background-color:#084284"|
|align=left|Aleksey Gudkov
|align=left|Spiritual Heritage
|
|0.27%
|-
|style="background-color:"|
|align=left|Vladimir Zakharov
|align=left|Independent
|
|0.24%
|-
|style="background-color:#000000"|
|colspan=2 |against all
|
|7.72%
|-
| colspan="5" style="background-color:#E9E9E9;"|
|- style="font-weight:bold"
| colspan="3" style="text-align:left;" | Total
| 
| 100%
|-
| colspan="5" style="background-color:#E9E9E9;"|
|- style="font-weight:bold"
| colspan="4" |Source:
|
|}

2003

|-
! colspan=2 style="background-color:#E9E9E9;text-align:left;vertical-align:top;" |Candidate
! style="background-color:#E9E9E9;text-align:left;vertical-align:top;" |Party
! style="background-color:#E9E9E9;text-align:right;" |Votes
! style="background-color:#E9E9E9;text-align:right;" |%
|-
|style="background-color:"|
|align=left|Vladimir Goryunov
|align=left|Independent
|
|37.33%
|-
|style="background-color:"|
|align=left|Yevgeny Ishchenko
|align=left|Independent
|
|28.48%
|-
|style="background-color:"|
|align=left|Aleksandr Golovanchikov
|align=left|Independent
|
|12.82%
|-
|style="background-color:#7C73CC"|
|align=left|Aleksey Koskov
|align=left|Great Russia – Eurasian Union
|
|1.93%
|-
|style="background-color:"|
|align=left|Igor Zaostrovsky
|align=left|Independent
|
|1.56%
|-
|style="background-color:#000000"|
|colspan=2 |against all
|
|15.73%
|-
| colspan="5" style="background-color:#E9E9E9;"|
|- style="font-weight:bold"
| colspan="3" style="text-align:left;" | Total
| 
| 100%
|-
| colspan="5" style="background-color:#E9E9E9;"|
|- style="font-weight:bold"
| colspan="4" |Source:
|
|}

2016

|-
! colspan=2 style="background-color:#E9E9E9;text-align:left;vertical-align:top;" |Candidate
! style="background-color:#E9E9E9;text-align:left;vertical-align:top;" |Party
! style="background-color:#E9E9E9;text-align:right;" |Votes
! style="background-color:#E9E9E9;text-align:right;" |%
|-
|style="background-color: " |
|align=left|Anna Kuvychko
|align=left|United Russia
|
|41.59%
|-
|style="background-color:"|
|align=left|Mikhail Tarantsov
|align=left|Communist Party
|
|22.22%
|-
|style="background-color:"|
|align=left|Yury Chekalin
|align=left|Liberal Democratic Party
|
|10.25%
|-
|style="background-color:"|
|align=left|Oleg Mikheyev
|align=left|A Just Russia
|
|9.04%
|-
|style="background:"| 
|align=left|Anatoly Barankevich
|align=left|Patriots of Russia
|
|4.38%
|-
|style="background:"| 
|align=left|Sergey Dorokhov
|align=left|Communists of Russia
|
|3.80%
|-
|style="background:"| 
|align=left|Sergey Korostin
|align=left|Yabloko
|
|1.90%
|-
|style="background:"| 
|align=left|Dmitry Nikitin
|align=left|People's Freedom Party
|
|1.83%
|-
|style="background-color:"|
|align=left|Eduard Protopopov
|align=left|The Greens
|
|1.60%
|-
| colspan="5" style="background-color:#E9E9E9;"|
|- style="font-weight:bold"
| colspan="3" style="text-align:left;" | Total
| 
| 100%
|-
| colspan="5" style="background-color:#E9E9E9;"|
|- style="font-weight:bold"
| colspan="4" |Source:
|
|}

2021

|-
! colspan=2 style="background-color:#E9E9E9;text-align:left;vertical-align:top;" |Candidate
! style="background-color:#E9E9E9;text-align:left;vertical-align:top;" |Party
! style="background-color:#E9E9E9;text-align:right;" |Votes
! style="background-color:#E9E9E9;text-align:right;" |%
|-
|style="background-color: " |
|align=left|Aleksey Volotskov
|align=left|United Russia
|
|61.67%
|-
|style="background-color:"|
|align=left|Yelena Svetlichnaya
|align=left|Communist Party
|
|13.76%
|-
|style="background-color:"|
|align=left|Alla Lukyanova
|align=left|A Just Russia — For Truth
|
|6.64%
|-
|style="background-color:"|
|align=left|Aleksey Kononenko
|align=left|Liberal Democratic Party
|
|6.13%
|-
|style="background-color: "|
|align=left|Vitaly Filareyev
|align=left|New People
|
|3.51%
|-
|style="background-color: "|
|align=left|Sergey Chukhayev
|align=left|Party of Pensioners
|
|2.91%
|-
|style="background-color: "|
|align=left|Leonid Pyltsin
|align=left|Party of Growth
|
|2.09%
|-
|style="background-color:"|
|align=left|Viktoria Sopoleva
|align=left|Rodina
|
|1.53%
|-
| colspan="5" style="background-color:#E9E9E9;"|
|- style="font-weight:bold"
| colspan="3" style="text-align:left;" | Total
| 
| 100%
|-
| colspan="5" style="background-color:#E9E9E9;"|
|- style="font-weight:bold"
| colspan="4" |Source:
|
|}

Notes

References

Russian legislative constituencies
Politics of Volgograd Oblast